King is the second studio album by American alternative rock band Belly, released on February 13, 1995.

Although the members had tightened their focus and polished their hook-laden songs, King and its singles did not meet label expectations in the grunge-friendly atmosphere of 1995, and the band broke up shortly after it was released. The album sold over 350,000 copies. In the two decades since Kings release, many (including some critics) have reconsidered the initial lukewarm attitude towards the album and now hold it as an equal to Belly's highly regarded debut Star.

Reception

In 2012, King was listed at number seven on PopMatters "15 Overlooked and Underrated Albums of the 1990s" list. In 2016, the album was hailed by Will Sheff of Okkervil River as "a winning, confident, masterful collection of songs – poppy and sweet and with a low-key psychedelic undercurrent. Everything good about Star was still there and had been expanded upon, but in many ways this felt like a new, reinvented band."

Track listing

Charts

References

1995 albums
Belly (band) albums
Albums produced by Glyn Johns
Sire Records albums
Reprise Records albums